Pontibacter deserti  is a Gram-negative bacterium from the genus of Pontibacter.

References 

Cytophagia
Bacteria described in 2014